Dervishka mogila is a village in the municipality of Svilengrad, in Haskovo Province, in southern Bulgaria.

References

Villages in Haskovo Province